A missile launch facility, also known as an underground missile silo, launch facility (LF), or nuclear silo, is a vertical cylindrical structure constructed underground, for the storage and launching of intercontinental ballistic missiles (ICBMs), intermediate-range ballistic missiles (IRBMs), medium-range ballistic missiles (MRBMs). Similar facilities can be used for anti-ballistic missiles (ABMs).

The structures typically have the missile some distance below ground, protected by a large "blast door" on top. They are usually connected, physically and/or electronically, to a missile launch control center.

With the introduction of the Soviet UR-100 and the U.S. Titan II missile series, underground silos changed in the 1960s. Both missile series introduced the use of hypergolic propellant, which could be stored in the missiles, allowing for rapid launches. Both countries' liquid-fueled missile systems were moved into underground silos. The introduction of solid fuel systems, in the later 1960s, made the silo moving and launching even easier.

The underground missile silo has remained the primary missile basing system and launch facility for land-based missiles since the 1960s. The increased accuracy of inertial guidance systems has rendered them somewhat more vulnerable than they were in the 1960s.

Other than underground facilities, ballistic missiles can be launched from above-ground facilities, or can be launched from mobile platforms, e.g. transporter erector launchers, railcars, ballistic missile submarines or airplanes.

Nazi Germany
The La Coupole facility is the earliest known precursor to modern underground missile silos still in existence. It was built by the forces of Nazi Germany in northern Occupied France, between 1943 and 1944, to serve as a launch base for V-2 rockets. The facility was designed with an immense concrete dome to store a large stockpile of V-2s, warheads and fuel, and was intended to launch V-2s on an industrial scale. Dozens of missiles a day were to be fuelled, prepared and rolled just outdoors of the facility's concrete casing, launched from either of two outdoor launch pads in rapid sequence against London and southern England. A similar-purpose but less-developed facility, the Blockhaus d'Eperlecques, had also been built, some 14.4 kilometers (8.9 miles) north-northwest of La Coupole, and closer to intended targets in southeastern England.

Following repeated heavy bombing by Allied forces during Operation Crossbow, the Germans were unable to complete construction of the works and the complex never entered service. The United Kingdom conducted post-war investigations, determining that it was "an assembly site for long projectiles most conveniently handled and prepared in a vertical position".

United States
The German idea of an underground missile silo was adopted and developed by the United States for missile launch facilities for its intercontinental ballistic missiles. Most silos were based in Colorado, Nebraska, North Dakota, South Dakota, Missouri, Montana, Wyoming and other western states. The first missile launch facility was located in Jersey Shore, Pennsylvania, however, there was a high school built on top of it in 1985. There were three main reasons behind this siting: reducing the flight trajectory between the United States and the Soviet Union, since the missiles would travel north over Canada and the North Pole; increasing the flight trajectory from SLBMs on either seaboard, giving the silos more warning time in the event of a nuclear war; and locating obvious targets as far away as possible from major population centres. They had many defense systems to keep out intruders and other defense systems to prevent destruction (see Safeguard Program). In addition to the three previously mentioned siting reasons, the US Air Force had other site requirements that were also taken into account such as, having the sites be close enough to a populace of roughly 50,000 people for community support along with making sure launch locations were far enough apart that a 10 MT detonation on or near strategic locations would not knock out other launch facilities in the area. "In 1960 the US Army established the Corps of Engineers Ballistic Missile Construction Office (CEBMCO), an independent organization under the Chief of Engineers, to supervise construction". This newly established organization was able to produce Minutemen Launch silos at an extremely fast rate of ~1.8 per day from 1961 to 1966 where they built a total of 1,000 Minuteman missile silos.

The United States built many missile silos in the Midwest, away from populated areas. Many were built in Colorado, Nebraska, South Dakota, and North Dakota. The U.S. spent considerable effort and funds in the 1970s and 1980s designing a replacement, but none of the new and complex system designs were ever produced.

The United States has many silo-based warheads in service, however, they have lowered their number to around 1800 and have transferred most of their missiles to nuclear submarines and are focusing on more advanced conventional weapons.

Today they are still used, although many have been decommissioned and hazardous materials removed. The increase of decommissioned missile silos has led governments to sell some of them to private individuals. Some buyers convert them into unique homes, advanced safe rooms, or use them for other purposes. They are popular sites of urban exploration.

Atlas facilities
The Atlas missiles used four different storage and launching methods.
 The first version were vertical and above-ground launchers, at Vandenberg Air Force Base on the Central Coast of California.
 The second version were stored horizontally in a shed-like structure with a retractable roof, to then be raised to the vertical and launched, at Francis E. Warren Air Force Base in Wyoming.
 The third version were stored horizontally, but better protected in a concrete building known as a "coffin", then raised to the vertical shortly before launch. These rather poorly protected designs were a consequence of the cryogenic liquid fuels used, which required the missiles to be stored unfueled and then be fueled immediately prior to launch.
 The fourth version were stored vertically in underground silos, for the Atlas F ICBM. They were fueled in the silo, and then since they could not be launched from within the silo, were raised to the surface to launch.

In 2000 William Leonard Pickard and a partner were convicted, in the largest lysergic acid diethylamide (LSD) manufacturing case in history, of conspiracy to manufacture large quantities of LSD in a decommissioned SM-65 Atlas missile silo (548-7) near Wamego, Kansas.

Titan facilities
The Titan I missile used a similar silo basing of the fourth Atlas version.

LGM-25C Titan II (deactivated) ICBMs were in a one ICBM launch control center (LCC) with one LF configuration (1 × 1). Titan missiles (both I and II) were located near their command and control operations personnel. Access to the missile was through tunnels connecting the launch control center and launch facility. An example of this can be seen at the Titan Missile Museum, located south of Tucson, Arizona.

Notable accidents:
 Fire in Titan II silo 373-4 – 1965 Searcy missile silo fire
 Titan II explosion in silo 374-7 – 1980 Damascus Titan missile explosion

Minuteman facilities

The solid fueled LGM-30 series Minuteman I, II, III, and Peacekeeper ICBM configurations consist of one LCC that controls ten LFs (1 × 10). Five LCCs and their fifty associated LFs make up a squadron. Three squadrons make up a wing. Measures were taken such that if any one LCC was disabled, a separate LCC within the squadron would take control of its ten ICBMs.

The LGM-30 LFs and LCCs are separated by several miles, connected only electronically.  This distance ensures that a nuclear attack could only disable a very small number of ICBMs, leaving the rest capable of being launched immediately.

Peacekeeper facilities
Dense Pack was a proposed configuration strategy for basing LGM-118 Peacekeeper ICBMs, developed under the Reagan administration, for the purpose of maximizing their survivability in case of a surprise nuclear first-strike on their silos conducted by a hostile foreign power. According to the Dense Pack strategy, a series of ten to twelve hardened silos would be grouped closely together in a line. The idea was that to disable the Dense Pack, the enemy would have to launch many missiles, and the missiles would arrive at different times. The missiles arriving later would have to pass through the debris cloud of the first missile's explosion, damaging the follow-up missiles and limiting their effectiveness.  The proposed Dense Pack initiative met with strong criticism in the media and in the government, and the idea was never implemented.

Soviet Union
The former Soviet Union had missile silos in Russia and adjacent Soviet states during the Cold War, such as the Plokštinė missile base in Lithuania. The Main Centre for Missile Attack Warning, near Solnechnogorsk outside Moscow, was completed by the Soviet Union in 1971, and remains in use by the Russian Federation.

Great Britain
Great Britain did not have any silo ICBMS. During the 1960's several surface based erector launcher pads for Thor ICBMS were installed but were removed just a few years later when Blue Steel carrying V bombers came into service.

Russia
Russia has silo-based weapons. The Strategic Rocket Forces of the Russian Federation (RVSN RF) (Strategic Missile Troops) controls Russia's land-based inter-continental ballistic missiles.

France
France built missile silos for S-2 and S-3 IRBM on the Albion Plateau.

China
China has silo-based weapons, but is now concentrating development on expanding its submarine and road-capable mobile weapons, especially for tunnel networks. Two silos fields appear to be under construction.

India
India uses silos for  a few of its long-range ballistic missile arsenal and storage, but most of its systems are road mobile capable.

Pakistan
Pakistan has built hard and deeply buried storage and launch facilities to retain a second strike capability in a nuclear war.

North Korea
North Korea built a missile silo complex south of Paektu Mountain. The silos are reportedly designed for mid- to long-range missiles, but it is not clear if all of them are operational.

Iran
Iran has silo-based weapons, having built a system of underground missile silos to protect missiles from detection and (above-ground) launch facilities from aerial destruction.

Israel
It is believed that Israel has MRBM and ICBM launch facilities.

Museums
 Titan Missile Museum Titan II ICBM 571-7 site
 Minuteman Missile National Historic Site Minuteman II ICBM LCC + D-09 silo
 Quebec-One Missile Alert Facility Peacekeeper ICBM Q-01 site
 Ronald Reagan Minuteman Missile State Historic Site Minuteman II ICBM O-01 MAF + N-33 LF
 Strategic missile forces museum in Ukraine RT-23/SS-24 Molodets ICBM UCP + silo
 Plokštinė missile base R-12 Dvina MRBM base
 Nike Missile Site SF-88 Nike 2B/12H, 20A/8L-U ABM SF-88 site
 RSL-3 Safeguard Program Remote Sprint Launchers 3 site

See also
 Missile launch control center
 Cheyenne Mountain Complex
 Safeguard/Sentinel ABM system
 A-35 anti-ballistic missile system
 A-135 anti-ballistic missile system
 List of Nike missile sites

References

 
Rockets and missiles
Military installations
Nuclear command and control
Nuclear warfare
British inventions
Military equipment of the Cold War